Vincent's bunting (Emberiza vincenti) is a passerine bird in the bunting family Emberizidae.  It was formerly considered a subspecies of the Cape bunting, and some taxonomists still consider it to be conspecific.

References

Vincent's bunting
Birds of East Africa
Vincent's bunting
Vincent's bunting